John Bakewell Jr. (1872–1963) was an American architect, based in San Francisco.  With Arthur Brown Jr., he formed the architectural firm of Bakewell and Brown, which designed many San Francisco Bay Area landmarks.  Following the dissolution of Bakewell and Brown in 1927, Bakewell formed the new partnership of Bakewell & Weihe with longtime employee Ernest Weihe.

Notable Work
 Arequipa Sanatorium, Fairfax, CA, 1911
 California School of Fine Arts, San Francisco, CA, 1926-1928
 San Francisco City Hall, San Francisco, CA, 1912-1915
 Berkeley City Hall, now the Maudelle Shirek Building, Berkeley, CA, 1908-1909
 Pasadena City Hall, Pasadena, CA, 1925-1927
 St. Mark's Episcopal Cathedral, Seattle, Capitol Hill, Seattle, WA, 1926–1930.  Incompletely constructed.
 Golden Gate International Exposition, French Indo-Chinese Pavilion, San Francisco, CA, 1937–1939.  Demolished 1939.
 Pacific Gas and Electric Company (PG & E), Headquarters Building, San Francisco, CA, 1924-1926
 Panama–Pacific International Exposition, Palace of Horticulture, San Francisco, CA, 1913-1915
 Regents of the University of California Office Building, South of Market, San Francisco, CA, 1910–1911.   Demolished 1983.
 Sacramento Valley Irrigation Company, Offices, 1910		
 San Francisco Housing Authority, Potrero Terrace Housing Development, San Francisco, CA, 1941-1942
 San Francisco War Memorial and Performing Arts Center, War Memorial Veterans' Building, San Francisco, CA, 1922-1932
 John D. Sloat Monument, Monterey, CA, 1907
 At Stanford University:
 John Henry Meyer House, Menlo Park, CA, 1920.  Now used as the Stanford Provost's residence.
 Branner Hall, 1922-1923
 Encina Commons, 1923
 Encina Gymnasium, 1915
 Cecil H. Green Library, 1919
 Hoover Institution of War, Revolution, and Peace, Hoover Tower, 1940-1941
 Stanford Memorial Auditorium, 1937
 Stanford Stadium, 1921
 "Old Union" student union, 1915
 Toyon Hall, 1922-1923
 Temple Emanu-El, San Francisco, CA, 1926
 50 United Nations Plaza Federal Office Building (San Francisco), San Francisco, CA, 1936
 W.C. Van Antwerp House ("Danvers House"), Burlingame, CA

References

External links
 John Bakewell Jr. at the Pacific Coast Architecture Database
 John Bakewell Jr. at archINFORM.

Beaux Arts architects
1872 births
1963 deaths
Architects from San Francisco
Mediterranean Revival architects
American alumni of the École des Beaux-Arts
Fellows of the American Institute of Architects
20th-century American architects